The Gemini Hummingbird is a family of American single seat, twin-engined ultralight aircraft. Designed in 1979, and introduced in 1980, the Hummingbird was designed by Ed Sweeney and produced by Gemini International. The aircraft was supplied assembled and ready to fly, or as a kit for amateur construction.

Design and development
The aircraft was designed before the US FAR 103 Ultralight Vehicles rules, but later versions were intended to specifically fit the category. The Hummingbird features a high wing, a V-tail, an open cockpit, tricycle landing gear and twin, wing-mounted engines in tractor configuration.

The aircraft is made from aluminum tubing, with its flying surfaces covered in Dacron sailcloth. Its 70% double-surface,  span wing is cable-braced from an inverted "V" kingpost on early models and is strut-braced on later versions. The pilot is accommodated in a web sling seat that allows foot-launching, an unwritten requirement for ultralights in the USA prior to FAR 103. The controls are three-axis, but on the Sport model the control stick activates all surfaces, including the ruddervators. The later 103 model introduced rudder pedals. The landing gear lacks suspension, but does feature nosewheel steering. Both models had structurally sound designs, and could maintain altitude on one engine. The more powerful Prospector engine equipped models are able to climb on one engine.

The 103 models were able to fold completely flat for easy transport or storage. They were designed to be transported on top of a car and required two people to set up. 

In 2009 Sweeney was experimenting with electric motors on one of his Hummingbirds, but no test flights were conducted.

Variants
Hummingbird Sport
Single-seat cable-braced model, powered by two  single-cylinder Husqvarna AB Partner chainsaw engines with reduction drives installed or, later, two twin-cylinder Limbach Flugmotoren engines.
Hummingbird 103
Was capable of folding flat for transport or storage.
Hummingbird 2
Two-seat model, with a structurally stronger airframe. It was considered a Light-Sport Aircraft instead of an ultralight, because it had two seats. Only one prototype was ever produced.

Specifications (Hummingbird 103)

See also

References

External links
Photo of Gemini Hummingbird

1980s United States ultralight aircraft
Homebuilt aircraft
Hummingbird
Parasol-wing aircraft
Twin piston-engined tractor aircraft
Aircraft first flown in 1979